Vincent de Tinténiac (c. 1764 in Bannalec – 18 July 1795 in château de Coëtlogon) was a French general.

Life
Before the French Revolution he had served as a naval lieutenant but been dismissed. In 1791 he joined the Association bretonne of Armand Tuffin de La Rouërie, in which he served as a liaison officer between Brittany and Jersey. On the Association's fall in 1793 he moved to fighting in the war in the Vendée, delivering to the Vendéens dispatches promising British help if they would help capture a port from the Republican forces. In 1794 Tinténiac helped Joseph de Puisaye to take command of the chouannerie. He then took an active part in the Quiberon landings, for which he was made a maréchal de camp, and then took command of a division of chouans. Charged with attacking the republican rear, he had to make a detour towards Saint-Brieuc, during which he was killed in a skirmish at château de Coetlogon.

1764 births
1795 deaths
Royalist military leaders of the War in the Vendée
French Navy officers